Wallace Nesbitt,  (May 13, 1858 – April 7, 1930) was a Canadian lawyer and puisne justice of the Supreme Court of Canada.

Born in Woodstock, Canada West (now Ontario), the son of John W. Nesbitt and Mary Wallace, he was called to the Ontario Bar in 1881. A practising lawyer, he was appointed to the Supreme Court of Canada in 1903. He served for two years until he resigned in 1905.

Nesbitt served as the president of the Ontario Bar Association from 1923 to 1927, and as national president of the Canadian Bar Association from 1928 to 1929.

Family

In 1887, Wallace Nesbitt married Louisa Andrée Plumb née Elliott (d. 1894), the widow of his one-time law partner Thomas Street Plumb (d. 1885), and became the stepfather of two young children. In memory of his stepson Gentleman Cadet Douglas Burr Plumb, who drowned at Romaine, Labrador on June 22, 1903, Wallace Nesbitt donated a stained glass memorial window in 1920 featuring a Royal Military College of Canada crest and motto.

References

External links
 
 Supreme Court of Canada biography

1858 births
1930 deaths
20th-century Canadian lawyers
Lawyers in Ontario
Canadian King's Counsel
Treasurers of the Law Society of Upper Canada
Justices of the Supreme Court of Canada
Canadian Bar Association Presidents
Burials at St. James Cemetery, Toronto
People from Woodstock, Ontario